Cédric Faivre (born April 8, 1981 in Montbéliard) is a French professional football player. Currently, he plays in the Championnat de France amateur for SR Colmar.

He played on the professional level in Ligue 1 for Troyes AC and Ligue 2 for FC Sochaux-Montbéliard and Troyes AC.

1981 births
Living people
Sportspeople from Montbéliard
French footballers
Ligue 1 players
Ligue 2 players
FC Sochaux-Montbéliard players
Racing Besançon players
ES Troyes AC players
SR Colmar players
ASM Belfort players
Stade Beaucairois players
Association football midfielders
Footballers from Bourgogne-Franche-Comté